Bern is a city in Nemaha County, Kansas, United States.  As of the 2020 census, the population of the city was 161.

History
Bern had its start in the late 1880s by the building of the railroad through that territory. It was named by Swiss immigrants after Bern, the capital of Switzerland.

Geography
Bern is located at  (39.9622218, -95.9719422).

Demographics

2010 census
As of the census of 2010, there were 166 people, 81 households, and 45 families residing in the city. The racial makeup of the city was 91.0% White, 0.6% African American, 3.0% Native American, 3.0% from other races, and 2.4% from two or more races. Hispanic or Latino of any race were 6.0% of the population.

There were 81 households, of which 21.0% had children under the age of 18 living with them, 48.1% were married couples living together, 4.9% had a female householder with no husband present, 2.5% had a male householder with no wife present, and 44.4% were non-families. 40.7% of all households were made up of individuals, and 16% had someone living alone who was 65 years of age or older. The average household size was 2.05 and the average family size was 2.73.

The median age in the city was 43.5 years. 18.7% of residents were under the age of 18; 10.1% were between the ages of 18 and 24; 22.8% were from 25 to 44; 28.2% were from 45 to 64; and 19.9% were 65 years of age or older. The gender makeup of the city was 51.8% male and 48.2% female.

2000 census
As of the census of 2000, there were 204 people, 86 households, and 55 families residing in the city. The racial makeup of the city was 99.51% White, and 0.49% from two or more races. Hispanic or Latino of any race were 1.96% of the population.

There were 86 households, out of which 37.2% had children under the age of 18 living with them, 55.8% were married couples living together, 3.5% had a female householder with no husband present, and 34.9% were non-families, and 24.4% had someone living alone who was 65 years of age or older. The average household size was 2.37 and the average family size was 3.02.

In the city, the population was spread out, with 27.5% under the age of 18, 6.4% from 18 to 24, 26.0% from 25 to 44, 21.6% from 45 to 64, and 18.6% who were 65 years of age or older. The median age was 40 years. For every 100 females, there were 92.5 males. For every 100 females age 18 and over, there were 85.0 males.

The median income for a household in the city was $40,417, and the median income for a family was $49,000. Males had a median income of $34,063 versus $21,563 for females. The per capita income for the city was $16,254. About 7.4% of families and 7.1% of the population were below the poverty line, including 5.6% of those under the age of eighteen and 5.7% of those 65 or over.

Education
The community is served by Prairie Hills USD 113 public school district, formed in 2010 by the merger of Sabetha USD 441 and Axtel USD 488.

Notable person
 Herman F. Krueger, Speaker of the Wyoming House of Representatives

See also
 Tornado outbreak of May 20–22, 2019

References

External links
 Bern - Directory of Public Officials
 Bern city map, KDOT

Cities in Kansas
Cities in Nemaha County, Kansas
Swiss-American history
1910 establishments in Kansas